The Headleys at Home is a 1938 American comedy film directed by Chris Beute and starring Evelyn Venable, Grant Mitchell and Vince Barnett.

Cast
 Evelyn Venable as Pamela Headley
 Grant Mitchell as Ernest Headley
 Robert Whitney as Bide Murphy
 Betty Roadman as Louisa Headley
 Vince Barnett as Vince Bergson
 Benny Rubin as Dr. McLevy
 Alicia Adams as Alicia Headley
 Louise Beavers as Hyacinth
 Kenneth Harlan as Smooth Adair
 Edward Earle as Van Wyck Schuyler
 Jack Hatfield as Rowland Perkins
 Ethel Clark as Mrs. Brown

References

Bibliography
 Goble, Alan. The Complete Index to Literary Sources in Film. Walter de Gruyter, 1999

External links
 

1938 films
1938 comedy films
American comedy films
American black-and-white films
1930s English-language films
1930s American films